The Naugaza Digambar Jain temple is situated near Naugaza in Alwar District, Rajasthan. The temple is situated near Neelkanth temple, Alwar.

History 
According to an inscription in the National Museum, this temple was constructed on the 13th day of the dark half of month Vaisakha, the second month in Hindu calendar, in VS 979 during the reign of Gurjara-Pratihara ruler Mahipala I Deva of Kannauj. The inscription mentions Sarvadeva of Simhapadra as the architect of the temple. Only a colossal  statue of Jain Tirthankara Shantinatha remains intact. The colossal statue is built in Digambara style.

Gallery

Conservation 
The temple is now protected by Archaeological Survey of India.

See also

 Jainism in Rajasthan
 Mahavira Jain temple, Osian
 Neelkanth temple

Reference

Citation

Source 
 
 

Jain architecture
Jain art
Jain temples in Rajasthan
10th-century Jain temples